João Alves dos Santos (December 9, 1956 – April 9, 2015) was a Roman Catholic bishop.

Ordained to the priesthood in 1982, Alves dos Santos was named bishop of the Roman Catholic Diocese of Paranaguá, Brazil in 2006. He died while still in office.

Notes

1956 births
2015 deaths
21st-century Roman Catholic bishops in Brazil
Roman Catholic bishops of Paranaguá